The Peoria Metropolitan Statistical Area, as defined by the United States Census Bureau, is an area consisting of six counties in Central Illinois, anchored by the city of Peoria. As of the 2020 census, the area had a population of 402,391. The City of Peoria, according to the 2020 US Census Bureau, has 113,150 people.

Counties
Marshall
Peoria
Stark
Tazewell
Woodford
Fulton*

Communities

Places with more than 100,000 inhabitants
Peoria (principal city)

Places with 10,000 to 40,000 inhabitants
East Peoria
Morton
Pekin
Washington

Places with 2,500 to 10,000 inhabitants
Bartonville
Chillicothe
Creve Coeur
Farmington
Germantown Hills
El Paso (partial)
Eureka
Henry
Marquette Heights
Metamora
Peoria Heights
Tremont
West Peoria

Places with 1,000 to 2,500 inhabitants 
Bellevue
Delavan
Elmwood
Glasford
Hanna City
Lacon
Mackinaw
Minier
Minonk
North Pekin
Princeville
Roanoke
Rome (census-designated place)
South Pekin
Toluca
Toulon
Washburn 
Wenona (partial)
Wyoming

Places with fewer than 1,000 inhabitants

Armington
Bay View Gardens
Benson
Bradford
Brimfield
Congerville
Deer Creek
Dunlap
Goodfield
Green Valley
Hopedale
Hopewell
Kappa
Kingston Mines
La Fayette
La Rose
Mapleton
Norwood
Panola
Secor
Sparland
Spring Bay
Varna

Unincorporated places

Alta
Broadmoor
Camp Grove
Castleton
Cramers
Edelstein
Edgewater
Edwards
El Vista
Elmore
Galena Knolls
Groveland
High Meadows
Holmes Center
Hopewell Estates
Komatsu Dresser
Lake Camelot
Lake Lancelot
Lake of the Woods
Laura
Lawn Ridge
Leeds
Lombardville
Lowpoint
Mardell Manor
Modena
Monica
Mossville
North Hampton
Oak Hill
Oak Ridge
Orchard Mines
Pattonsburg
Pottstown
Renchville
Rome Heights
Saratoga Center
Saxton
Smithville
South Rome
Southport
Speer
Spires
Tuscarora
Vets Row
Vonachen Knolls
West Hallock
Wilbern
Woodford

Townships

Akron
Bell Plain
Bennington
Boynton
Brimfield
Cazenovia
Chillicothe
Cincinnati
Clayton
Cruger
Deer Creek
Delavan
Dillon
El Paso
Elm Grove
Elmira
Elmwood
Essex
Evans
Fondulac
Goshen
Greene
Groveland
Hallock
Henry
Hittle
Hollis
Hopedale
Hopewell
Jubilee
Kansas
Kickapoo
La Prairie
Lacon
Limestone
Linn
Little Mackinaw
Logan
Mackinaw
Malone
Medina
Metamora
Millbrook
Minonk
Montgomery
Morton
Olio
Osceola
Palestine
Panola
Partridge
Pekin
Penn
Princeville
Radnor
Richland
Richwoods
Roanoke
Roberts
Rosefield
Sand Prairie
Saratoga
Spring Bay
Spring Lake
Steuben
Timber
Toulon
Tremont
Trivoli
Valley
Washington
West Jersey
West Peoria
Whitefield
Worth

Combined Statistical Area
The Peoria–Canton Combined Statistical Area was made up of six counties in central Illinois. The statistical area includes one metropolitan area and one micropolitan area. As of the 2000 Census, the CSA had a population of 405,149 (though a July 1, 2009 estimate placed the population at 412,517). US Census Bureau integrated the previous Canton Statistical Area into the Peoria MSA, therefore now the CSA is now longer in existence.

Metropolitan Statistical Areas (MSAs)
Peoria (Marshall, Peoria, Stark, Tazewell Fulton and Woodford counties)

Demographics
As of the census of 2020, there were 402,391 people within the MSA. The racial makeup of the MSA was 88.54% White, 8.40% African American, 0.23% Native American, 1.05% Asian, 0.02% Pacific Islander, 0.59% from other races, and 1.18% from two or more races. Hispanic or Latino of any race were 1.52% of the population.

The median income for a household in the MSA was $42,805, and the median income for a family was $50,756. Males had a median income of $38,135 versus $23,793 for females. The per capita income for the MSA was $20,104.

See also
Illinois census statistical areas

References

 
Geography of Marshall County, Illinois
Geography of Peoria County, Illinois
Geography of Stark County, Illinois
Geography of Tazewell County, Illinois
Geography of Woodford County, Illinois
Metropolitan areas of Illinois